Wang Chuanfu (born 1966) is a Chinese chemist, billionaire entrepreneur, and the founder, chairman and CEO of BYD Company.

Early life
Wang was born in Wuwei County, Anhui province to a family of poor farmers. While in high school he was cared for by his elder brother and sister because both of his parents had died. After high school he studied chemistry at the Central South University, and went on to earn a master's degree in 1990 from the Beijing Non-Ferrous Research Institute.

Career
He spent several years as a government researcher, but in 1995 he entered the private sector and founded his own company, BYD Company, outside of Shenzhen. Founded with his cousin Lu Xiangyang when he was 29 years old, BYD Company is currently the world's biggest mobile phone batteries manufacturer. In early 2009, he was reportedly worth US$3.4 billion, placing him 408th on Hurun Report's Global Rich List 2014 . In late 2009, his worth grew to $5.1 billion and was crowned China's richest man on the Hurun Report. This was due largely to a fivefold increase in his company's value after Berkshire Hathaway bought 225 million new shares of BYD in 2008.

In November 2021, Forbes reported that Wang's wealth had increased to $23.5 billion, making him the 14th richest person in China, this was due to a twofold increase in BYD's share price over the previous year.

Personal life
He is married and lives in Shenzhen.

References

1966 births
Living people
Chinese billionaires
People from Wuhu
Businesspeople from Anhui
Chemists from Anhui
Chinese chief executives in the automobile industry
BYD Company people
21st-century Chinese businesspeople
Chinese founders of automobile manufacturers
Central South University alumni
Automotive businesspeople